Marcos Mazzaron (born 5 November 1963) is a retired road bicycle racer and track cyclist from Brazil.

Mazzaron represented his native country at two consecutive Summer Olympics, starting in 1984.  He also won the silver medal in the Men's Individual Race Race (171 km) at the 1987 Pan American Games.

References

External links

1963 births
Living people
Cyclists at the 1984 Summer Olympics
Cyclists at the 1988 Summer Olympics
Cyclists at the 1987 Pan American Games
Olympic cyclists of Brazil
Brazilian road racing cyclists
Brazilian track cyclists
Brazilian male cyclists
Place of birth missing (living people)
Pan American Games silver medalists for Brazil
Pan American Games medalists in cycling
Medalists at the 1987 Pan American Games
People from Arapongas
Sportspeople from Paraná (state)
21st-century Brazilian people
20th-century Brazilian people